Giman may refer to:
 Giman, Iranshahr
 Giman, Sarbaz

See also
 Gimån, a river in Sweden